Coupe de Mayotte is the top division of the Ligue de Football de Mayotte and was created in 1977.

Previous winners
197? : Etoile Polaire                  bt  Olympic de Pamandzi
1980 : AS Sada                         2-1 FC Mtsapéré
1981 : FC Mtsapéré                    2-1 Avenir de Labattoir
1982 : not known
1983 : FC Mtsapéré                    4-1 Olympic de Pamandzi
1984 : not known
1985 : FC Mtsapéré                    3-1 Volcan
1986 : Miracle du Sud (Bouéni) (?)
1987 : FC Mtsapéré                    7-3 AS Sada
1988 : Ouragan de Labattoir            3-1 FC Mtsapéré
1989 : not known
1990 : not known
1991 : FC Mtsapéré                    4-3 AS Sada
1992 : Ouragan de Labbatoir (?)
1993 : FC Mtsapéré                    1-0 Chembényoumba
1994 : AS Rosador (Passamainty)
1995 : FC Mtsapéré                    1-0 AS Rosador (Passamainty)
1996 : FC Mtsapéré                    2-1 AS Rosador (Passamainty)
1997 : Miracle du Sud (Bouéni) (?)
1998 : AS Rosador (Passamainty)           bt  FC Kani Bé
1999 : Jumeaux (M'zouasia) 
2000 : FC Kani Bé                      bt  Miracle du Sud (Bouéni)
2001 : final FCO (Tsingoni) vs Rosador (Passamainty)
2002 : Pamandzi SC                     3-1 FC Mtsapéré
2003 : Pamandzi SC                     drw FCO (Tsingoni)              [Pamandzi on pen]
2004  : Pamandzi SC                     bt  AS Sada
2005/06 : Hamjago FC                         3-1 Bandrélé Foot
2006 : UCS Sada                        2-0 FCO Tsingoni
2007 : Etincelles d'Hamjago            1-0 FCO Tsingoni
2008 : FC Labattoir                    2-0 FC Passamainty
2009 : AS Rosador (Passamainty)        0-0 FC Mtsapéré                [aet, 6-5 pen]
2010 : US Ouangani                     4-0 Diables Noirs
2011 : tournament abandoned
2012 : AS Neige (Malamani)             1-1 ASC Abeilles (Mtsapere)    [aet, 4-2 pen]
2013 : Miracle du Sud (Bouéni)         0-0 Jumeaux (Mzouasia)          [aet, 5-4 pen]
2014 : Jumeaux (M'zouasia) 4-1 VCO Vahibé
2015 : Olympique de Miréréni           0-0 FC Labattoir               [aet, 5-4 pen]
2016 : UCS Sada                        3-0 ASJ Handréma
2017 : FC Mtsapéré                     1-0 Foudre 2000 de Dzoumogné
2018 : FC Labattoir                    2-1 Foudre 2000 de Dzoumogné
2019 :   FC Mtsapéré                    2-0 Diables Noirs (Combani)
2020/21 : AS Jumeaux (Mzouasia)           3-1 ASC Abeilles (Mtsamboro)

External links
RSSSF competition history

Football competitions in Mayotte
Mayotte
Mayotte
1977 establishments in Mayotte